The Billboard Latin Pop Airplay chart ranks the best-performing Spanish-language pop music singles in the United States. Published by Billboard magazine, the data are compiled by Nielsen SoundScan based collectively on each single's weekly airplay.

Chart history

See also
List of number-one Billboard Hot Latin Songs of 2008

References

United States Latin Pop Airplay
2008
2008 in Latin music